Charlie Parker (born December 24, 1948) is an American basketball coach, currently the head coach for Taiwan men's national basketball team in FIBA Asia.

Coaching career
Parker is currently head coach for Taiwan's national basketball team.  Parker was an assistant coach for the New Orleans Hornets from 2006–2010. His previous coaching position was at the Dallas Mavericks, where he was an assistant coach for ten seasons (1996–2005).  Prior to that, he coached the USC Trojans.  Parker was head coach at Wayne State from 1982 to 1988. Prior to that, he coached at Bowling Green and his alma mater, University of Findlay.

Head coaching record

|- 
| style="text-align:left;"|Gunma Crane Thunders
| style="text-align:left;"|2014–15
| 52||19||33|||| style="text-align:center;"|8th in Eastern|||2||0||2||
| style="text-align:center;"|Lost in 1st round
|-

References

External links

1948 births
Living people
American men's basketball coaches
Bowling Green Falcons men's basketball coaches
Bowling Green State University alumni 
Dallas Mavericks assistant coaches
Findlay Oilers men's basketball players
Gunma Crane Thunders coaches
New Orleans Hornets assistant coaches
USC Trojans men's basketball coaches
Wayne State Warriors men's basketball coaches
American men's basketball players
American expatriate basketball people in Taiwan
Chinese Taipei men's national basketball team coaches